Zoltán Bátorfi (born 20 July 1975) is a Hungarian table tennis player. He competed in the men's singles event at the 1996 Summer Olympics.

References

External links
 

1975 births
Living people
Hungarian male table tennis players
Olympic table tennis players of Hungary
Table tennis players at the 1996 Summer Olympics
Sportspeople from Szombathely